Gaimar, Guaimar, or Waimar is a Germanic given name that historically could refer to:
Guaimar I of Salerno
Guaimar II of Salerno
Guaimar III of Salerno
Guaimar IV of Salerno
Guaimar II of Amalfi
Geoffrey Gaimar

See also
Qaymar, an Iraqi dairy product made out of water buffalo milk